A pardon is the forgiveness of a crime.

Pardon may also refer to:

 Pardon (name), a list of people with the surname or given name
 Pardon (ceremony), a Breton form of pilgrimage
 Pardon (film), a 2005 Turkish film
 The Pardon, a 2013 American drama film
 pardon (magazine), a German satirical biweekly 1962–1982

See also
"Pardon Me", 1999 song by American rock band Incubus
"Pardon Me", 2005 song by Weezer from the album Make Believe